Tahicelis Susana Marcano Vargas (born 12 April 1997) is a Venezuelan footballer who plays as a midfielder for the Costa Rican first division club SUVA Sports and Venezuela women's national team.

International career
Marcano represented Venezuela at the 2014 FIFA U-17 Women's World Cup and the 2016 FIFA U-20 Women's World Cup. At senior level, she played the 2014 Central American and Caribbean Games.

International goals
Scores and results list Venezuela's goal tally first

References

1997 births
Living people
Women's association football midfielders
Women's association football forwards
Venezuelan women's footballers
Venezuela women's international footballers
Competitors at the 2014 Central American and Caribbean Games
Deportivo Anzoátegui players